Şemsi Yaralı (July 20, 1982) is a world and European champion Turkish female boxer competing in the heavyweight division. She is a member of the Fenerbahçe SK in İstanbul, Turkey.

She participated at the 3rd World Women's Boxing Championship held between September 25 and October 2, 2005 in Podolsk, Russia, and fought a silver medal in the cruiserweight (86 kg) division. She won a bronze medal in the same division at the 4th World Women's Boxing Championship held between November 18 and 23, 2006 in New Delhi, India. She had won a bronze medal and Hasibe Erkoç won a gold medal for Turkey. At the 5th AIBA Women's World Boxing Championship held between November 22 and 29, 2008 in Ningbo City, China, Şemsi Yaralı became a gold medalist in her division (86 kg).

At the 2011 Women's European Amateur Boxing Championships held in Rotterdam, Netherlands, Yaralı became European champion.

Achievements
2005 Women's World Amateur Boxing Championships Podolsk, Russia 86 kg -  
2006 World Women's Boxing Championship New Delhi, India  86 kg - 
2006 Women's European Amateur Boxing Championships Warsaw, Poland  86 kg -   
2006 Women's European Union Amateur Boxing Championships Porto Torres, Italy  86 kg -  
2007 Women's European Union Amateur Boxing Championships Lille, France  86 kg -  
2008 World Women's Boxing Championship Ningbo, China  86 kg - 
2008 Women's European Union Amateur Boxing Championships Liverpool, England 86 kg -  
2009 Women's European Amateur Boxing Championships Mykolaiv, Ukraine +81 kg - 
2010 Women's European Union Amateur Boxing Championships Keszthely, Hungary +81 kg - 
2011 Women's European Amateur Boxing Championships Rotterdam, Netherlands +81 kg -

External links
 Superonline

References 

1982 births
Living people
Turkish women boxers
Place of birth missing (living people)
Heavyweight boxers
Fenerbahçe boxers
European champions for Turkey
AIBA Women's World Boxing Championships medalists